Elections to Dungannon District Council were held on 18 May 1977 on the same day as the other Northern Irish local government elections. The election used four district electoral areas to elect a total of 20 councillors.

Election results

Note: "Votes" are the first preference votes.

Districts summary

|- class="unsortable" align="centre"
!rowspan=2 align="left"|Ward
! % 
!Cllrs
! % 
!Cllrs
! %
!Cllrs
! %
!Cllrs
!rowspan=2|TotalCllrs
|- class="unsortable" align="center"
!colspan=2 bgcolor="" | UUP
!colspan=2 bgcolor="" | SDLP
!colspan=2 bgcolor="" | DUP
!colspan=2 bgcolor="white"| Others
|-
|align="left"|Area A
|bgcolor="40BFF5"|34.4
|bgcolor="40BFF5"|2
|30.2
|2
|9.8
|1
|25.6
|0
|5
|-
|align="left"|Area B
|21.9
|1
|26.5
|2
|0.0
|0
|bgcolor="#CDFFAB"|51.6
|bgcolor="#CDFFAB"|2
|5
|-
|align="left"|Area C
|bgcolor="40BFF5"|71.1
|bgcolor="40BFF5"|4
|23.8
|1
|0.0
|0
|5.1
|0
|5
|-
|align="left"|Area D
|27.2
|1
|17.5
|1
|15.0
|1
|bgcolor="#DDDDDD"|40.3
|bgcolor="#DDDDDD"|2
|5
|-
|- class="unsortable" class="sortbottom" style="background:#C9C9C9"
|align="left"| Total
|38.1
|8
|24.5
|6
|6.1
|2
|31.3
|4
|20
|-
|}

Districts results

Area A

1973: 3 x UUP, 1 x SDLP, 1 x Unity
1977: 2 x UUP, 2 x SDLP, 1 x DUP
1973-1977 Change: SDLP and DUP gain from UUP and Unity

Area B

1973: 2 x SDLP, 2 x Independent Republican, 1 x UUP
1977: 2 x SDLP, 1 x UUP, 1 x Independent Nationalist, 1 x Independent Republican
1973-1977 Change: SDLP gain from Independent Republican, Independent Nationalist leaves SDLP

Area C

1973: 4 x UUP, 1 x SDLP
1977: 4 x UUP, 1 x SDLP
1973-1977 Change: No change

Area D

1973: 3 x UUP, 1 x SDLP, 1 x Unity
1977: 2 x Independent, 1 x UUP, 1 x SDLP, 1 x DUP
1973-1977 Change: Independent (two seats) and DUP gain from UUP (two seats) and Unity

References

Dungannon and South Tyrone Borough Council elections
Dungannon and South Tyrone